The caliphate of the Ottoman Empire was the claim of the heads of the Turkish Ottoman dynasty to be the caliphs of Islam in the late medieval and the early modern era. During the period of Ottoman expansion, Ottoman rulers claimed caliphal authority after the conquest of Mamluk Egypt by Sultan Selim I in 1517, which bestowed the title of Defender of the Holy Cities of Mecca and Medina upon him and strengthened the Ottoman claim to caliphate in the Muslim world.

The demise of the Ottoman Caliphate took place because of a slow erosion of power in relation to Western Europe, and because of the end of the Ottoman state as a consequence of the partitioning of the Ottoman Empire by the League of Nations mandate. Abdulmejid II, the last Ottoman caliph, held his caliphal position for a couple of years after the partitioning, but with Mustafa Kemal Pasha's secular reforms and the subsequent exile of the imperial Osmanoğlu family from Turkey in 1924, the caliphal position was abolished. Mustafa Kemal Pasha offered the caliphate to Ahmed Sharif as-Senussi, on the condition that he reside outside Turkey; Senussi declined the offer and confirmed his support for Abdulmejid II.

With the establishments of Bektashi and Mevlevi orders, heterodox, syncretic and mystic approaches to Islam like Sufism flourished.

History

1517–1875

In 1517, the Ottoman Sultan Selim I defeated the Mamluk Sultanate in Cairo in the Ottoman–Mamluk War. The last caliph of Cairo, Al-Mutawakkil III, was brought back to Constantinople as prisoner. There, it is said, al-Mutawakkil formally surrendered the title of caliph as well as its outward emblems—the sword and mantle of Muhammad—to Selim, establishing the Ottoman sultans as the new caliphal line. And they gradually came to be viewed as the de facto leaders and representative of the Islamic world. From Constantinople, the Ottoman sultans ruled over an empire that, at its peak, covered Anatolia, most of the Middle East, North Africa, the Caucasus, and extended deep into Eastern Europe.

Strengthened by the Peace of Westphalia and the Industrial Revolution, European powers regrouped and challenged Ottoman dominance. Owing largely to poor leadership, archaic political norms, and an inability to keep pace with technological progress in Europe, the Ottoman Empire could not respond effectively to Europe's resurgence and gradually lost its position as a pre-eminent great power.

The first political (rather than religious) usage of the title caliph, however, would not occur until 1774, when the Ottomans needed to counter the Russians, who announced that they needed to protect Orthodox Christians under the Ottoman Empire, by making a similar claim about the Muslims living in Russia. The British would tactfully affirm the Ottoman claim to the caliphate and proceed to have the Ottoman caliph issue orders to the Muslims living in British India to comply with the British government.

In the nineteenth century the Ottoman Empire initiated a period of modernization known as the Tanzimat, which transformed the nature of the Ottoman state, greatly increasing its power despite the empire's territorial losses. Despite the success of its self-strengthening reforms, the empire was largely unable to match the military strength of its main rival, the Russian Empire, and suffered several defeats in the Russo-Turkish Wars. The Ottoman state defaulted on its loans in 1875–76, part of a wider financial crisis affecting much of the globe.

The British government supported the view that the Ottomans were Caliphs of Islam among Muslims in British India and the Ottoman Sultans in return helped the British by issuing pronouncements to the Muslims of India, which extolled them to support British rule; these came from Sultan Selim III and Sultan Abdulmejid I.

Sultan Abdul Hamid II, 1876–1909

Sultan Abdul Hamid II, who ruled 1876–1909, felt that the Empire's desperate situation could only be remedied through strong and determined leadership. He distrusted his ministers and other officials that had served his predecessors and gradually reduced their role in his regime, concentrating absolute power over the Empire's governance in his own hands. Taking a hard-line against Western involvement in Ottoman affairs, he emphasized the Empire's "Islamic" character, reasserted his status as the Caliph, and called for Muslim unity behind the Caliphate. Abdul-Hamid strengthened the Empire's position somewhat, and succeeded briefly in reasserting Islamic power, by building numerous schools, reducing the national debt, and embarking on projects aimed at revitalizing the Empire's decaying infrastructure.

In 1899, the Ottomans would comply with a request from the United States government and leverage their religious authority as caliphs to order that Tausug Sultanate of Sulu (located in the Philippines) stop resisting and submit to U.S. sovereignty; the Tausug people would heed Sultan Abdul-Hamid II's order, and surrender.

The coup by the three Pashas in 1909 marked the end of his reign. Western-inclined Turkish military officers opposed to Abdul-Hamid's rule had steadily organized in the form of secret societies within and outside Turkey. By 1906, the movement enjoyed the support of a significant portion of the army, and its leaders formed the Committee of Union and Progress (CUP), informally known as the Young Turk Party. The Young Turks sought to remodel administration of the Empire along Western lines. Their ideology was nationalist in character, and was a precursor of the movement that would seize control of Turkey following World War I. CUP leaders presented their ideas to the public as a revival of true Islamic principles. Under the leadership of Enver Pasha, a Turkish military officer, the CUP launched a military coup against the Sultan in 1908, proclaiming a new regime on 6 July. Though they left Abdul-Hamid on his throne, the Young Turks compelled him to restore the parliament and constitution he had suspended thirty years earlier, thereby creating a constitutional monarchy and stripping the Caliphate of its authority.

Counter-coup and 31 March Incident

A counter-coup launched by soldiers loyal to the Sultan threatened the new government but ultimately failed. After nine months into the new parliamentary term, discontent and reaction found expression in a fundamentalist movement, the counter-revolutionary 31 March Incident, which actually occurred on 13 April 1909. Many aspects of this revolt, which started within certain sections of the mutinying army in Constantinople, are still yet to be analyzed. Its generally admitted perception of a "reactionary" movement has sometimes been challenged, given the results and effects on the young political system.

Abdul-Hamid was deposed on 13 April 1909. He was replaced by his brother Rashid Effendi, who was proclaimed Sultan Mehmed V on 27 April.

Sultan Mehmed V, 1909–18

With Libya
In 1911 Italy warred with the Ottomans over Libya, and Turkey's failure to defend these regions demonstrated the weakness of the Ottoman military. In 1912 Bulgaria, Serbia, Montenegro, and Greece formed the Balkan League, an anti-Ottoman alliance that subsequently launched a joint attack on the Ottoman Empire. The ensuing Balkan Wars eliminated what little presence the Ottomans had left in Europe, and only infighting between the Balkan League allies prevented them from advancing into Anatolia.

Internally, the Ottomans continued to be troubled by political instability. Nationalist uprisings that had plagued the Empire sporadically for the past fifty years intensified. The masses were growing frustrated with chronic misgovernance and the Ottomans' poor showing in military conflicts. In response, the CUP led a second coup d'état in 1913 and seized absolute control of the government. For the next five years, the Empire was a one-party state ruled by the CUP under the leadership of Enver Pasha (who returned to Constantinople after having served Turkey abroad in various military and diplomatic capacities since the initial coup), Minister of the Interior Talat Pasha, and Minister of the Navy Cemal Pasha. Though the Sultan was retained, he made no effort to exercise power independent of the Young Turks and was effectively their puppet. The Caliphate was thus held nominally by Mehmed V, but the authority attached to the office rested with the Young Turks.

World War I

As World War I broke out in Europe, the Young Turks struck an alliance with Germany, a move that would have disastrous consequences. The Empire entered the war on the side of the Central Powers in November 1914, and Britain, France, and Russia immediately declared war on Ottoman Empire. During the development of the war, the empire's position continued to deteriorate, and even in the Middle East – the very heartland of the Islamic world – would soon be lost.

Call for Jihad

Though the Young Turks had compelled the Sultan in his capacity as the Caliph to declare a jihad urging all Muslims to resist Allied encroachment on their lands, the effort was largely unsuccessful. The Young Turk government resigned en masse and Enver, Talat, and Cemal fled Turkey aboard a German warship. Sultan Mehmed VI, who was proclaimed Sultan after his brother Mehmed V died of a heart attack in July, agreed to an armistice. The Armistice of Mudros formalizing Ottoman surrender was signed aboard HMS Agamemnon on October 30, 1918. Allied troops arrived in Constantinople and occupied the Sultan's palace shortly thereafter.International Law Studies

Partitioning of the Ottoman Empire

By the end of the war, the Ottomans had lost virtually their entire Empire. Hoping to keep his throne and preserve the Ottoman dynasty in some form or another, the Sultan agreed to cooperate with the Allies. He dissolved parliament and allowed an Allied military administration to replace the government vacated by the Young Turks.

Khilafat Movement

The Khilafat movement (1919–1924) was a political campaign launched mainly by Muslims in British India to influence the British government to ensure the survival of the Caliphate during the aftermath of World War I.

The defeat of the Ottomans and the Allied occupation of Constantinople left the Ottoman state and the Caliphate with no solid basis. The Khilafat movement sought to remedy this. The movement gained force after the Treaty of Sèvres in August 1920, which codified the partitioning of the Ottoman Empire.

Abolition

The Turkish national movement, as the details explained in Turkish War of Independence, formed a Turkish Grand National Assembly in Ankara on April 23, 1920, and secured formal recognition of the nation's independence and new borders on 20 Feb, 1923 through the Treaty of Lausanne. The National Assembly declared Turkey a republic on October 29, 1923, and proclaimed Ankara its new capital. After over 600 years, the Ottoman Empire had officially ceased to exist. However, under Allied direction, the Sultan pledged to suppress such movements and secured an official fatwa from the Sheikh ul-Islam declaring them to be un-Islamic. But the nationalists steadily gained momentum and began to enjoy widespread support. Many sensed that the nation was ripe for revolution. In an effort to neutralize this threat, the Sultan agreed to hold elections, with the hope of placating and co-opting the nationalists. To his dismay, nationalist groups swept the polls, prompting him to again dissolve parliament in April 1920.

Initially, the National Assembly seemed willing to allow a place for the Caliphate in the new regime, agreeing to the appointment of Mehmed's cousin Abdülmecid as caliph upon Mehmed's departure (November 1922). But the position had been stripped of any authority, and Abdülmecid's purely ceremonial reign would be short lived. Mustafa Kemal had been a vocal critic of the Ottoman House and its Islamic orientation. When Abdülmecid was declared caliph, Kemal refused to allow the traditional Ottoman ceremony to take place, bluntly declaring: 

In response to Abdülmecid's petition for an increase in his pay, Kemal wrote: 

Still, for all the power he had already wielded in Turkey, Kemal did not dare to abolish the Caliphate outright, as it still commanded a considerable degree of support from the common people.

Then in 1924, two Indian brothers, Maulana Mohammad Ali Jauhar and Maulana Shaukat Ali, leaders of the Indian-based Khilafat Movement, distributed pamphlets calling upon the Turkish people to preserve the Ottoman Caliphate for the sake of Islam. Under Turkey's new nationalist government, however, this was construed as foreign intervention, and any form of foreign intervention was labelled an insult to Turkish sovereignty, and worse, a threat to State security. Kemal promptly seized his chance. On his initiative, the National Assembly abolished the Caliphate on March 3, 1924. Abdülmecid was sent into exile along with the remaining members of the Ottoman House. Mustafa Kemal Pasha offered the caliphate to Ahmed Sharif as-Senussi, on the condition that he reside outside Turkey; Senussi declined the offer and confirmed his support for Abdulmejid.

See also
Islam in the Ottoman Empire
Vassal and tributary states of the Ottoman Empire

References

Bibliography
 Deringil, Selim.  "Legitimacy Structures in the Ottoman State: The Reign of Abdulhamid II (1876-1909), International Journal of Middle East Studies, Vol. 23, No. 3 (August, 1991).
 Haddad, Mahmoud.  "Arab Religious Nationalism in the Colonial Era: Rereading Rashid Rida's Ideas on the Caliphate", Journal of the American Oriental Society, Vol. 117, No. 2 (April, 1997).
 Kedourie, Elie.  "The End of the Ottoman Empire", Journal of Contemporary History, Vol. 3, No. 4 (October, 1968).
 Lewis, Bernard.  "The Ottoman Empire and Its Aftermath", Journal of Contemporary History, Vol. 15, No. 1 (January, 1980).
 Hussain, Ishtiaq. "The Tanzimat: Secular Reforms in the Ottoman Empire", Faith Matters (October 2011)

External links
Ottoman Caliphate

1517 establishments in the Ottoman Empire
1924 disestablishments in Turkey
Caliphates
Government of the Ottoman Empire
History of the Ottoman Empire
Islam in the Ottoman Empire
1920s in Islam